The Andreasson BA-4B is a single-seat aerobatic biplane which was marketed for homebuilding and also produced complete.

Design and development

The BA-B4B was based on Andreasson's 1944 wooden BA-4 revised to take advantage of more modern construction techniques, such as the use of sheet metal. The first example was built by apprentices at the Malmö Aircraft Industry (M.F.I.).  It is a single-bay, staggered-wing biplane with fixed tailwheel undercarriage. P.J.C Phillips acquired worldwide production rights for complete, rather than kit built, version and marketed them in the UK through Crosby Aviation. In the US the B-4B was marketed by Larry Karp as the Canary Hawk.

Operational history
In 2014 there were six BA-4Bs on the UK civil register, one Crosby built and the others homebuilt. In 2009 four BA-4Bs remained on the Swedish register.

Variants

Andeasson B-4 (Midget) Wood and fabric biplane first flown in 1944, powered by a  Scott Squirrel.
Andreasson B-4B All-metal version.  First prototype built by M.F.I apprentices in c.1964. Plans marketed.
Crosby (Andreasson) B-4B Sold complete, powered by a  Rolls-Royce Continental O-200-A flat four.
Crosby (Andreasson) Super B-4B As B-4B but with a  Rolls-Royce Continental O-240-A flat four.

Specifications (Crosby (Andreasson) BA-4B)

See also

References

Notes

Bibliography
 
 

1960s Swedish sport aircraft
Homebuilt aircraft
Aerobatic aircraft
Single-engined tractor aircraft
Biplanes
Aircraft first flown in 1966